Kathy Kacer (born 6 September 1954) is a Canadian author of fiction and non-fiction for children about The Holocaust, and has written one adult fiction book (Restitution). She has won several awards and her books have been translated into a variety of languages (e.g. Die Kinder aus Theresienstadt, German translation of Clara's War and ちいさな命がくれた勇気, Japanese translation of The Underground Reporters).  As well as writing, she speaks to children about the Holocaust, and to educators about teaching sensitive issues to young children.

Personal life
Both Kacer's Jewish parents, Gabriela (née Offenberg) and Arthur Kacer, were Holocaust survivors, her father having been in a concentration camp and her mother living in hiding.  Kacer was born in Toronto, where she still lives, and is married to a lawyer, Ian Epstein. They have two children, Broadway talent Gabi Epstein and actor and singer Jake Epstein. Kacer has a master's degree in psychology and worked with troubled teenagers before becoming a full-time writer in 1998.

Works

Children's fiction
 The Secret of Gabi's Dresser (1999, Second Story Press), pre-teen fiction
Kacer's mother's experiences included hiding in a dresser, or cupboard
 Night Spies (2003, Second Story Press), "pre-teen non-fiction"
A sequel to The Secret of Gabi's Dresser
 Clara's War (2001, Second Story Press)
Based around true stories of the opera Brundibár produced in Theresienstadt
 The Diary of Laura's Twin (2008, Second Story Press)
A contemporary Jewish girl is "twinned" with a girl of the same age in the Warsaw Ghetto through her diary
 Margit (Our Canadian Girl series, Penguin Books Canada), pre-teen fiction
The central character, Margit, has fled with her mother from the Nazis in Czecholslovakia to Canada
 Home Free
 A Bit of Love and a Bit of Luck
 Open Your Doors
 A Friend in Need

Children's nonfiction
 The Underground Reporters (2004, Toronto: Second Story Press) 
A group of Jewish children in hiding in Czechoslovakia created a local newspaper, Klepy 
 Hiding Edith (2006, Second Story Press), pre-teen nonfiction
The story of Edith Schwab and other Jewish children being hidden and protected in a French village
To Hope and Back: The Journey of the St. Louis (2010, Second Story)
The story of the 1939 voyage of the MS St. Louis, when German Jewish refugees were turned away from Cuba, the US and Canada
 Whispers trilogy, co-written with Sharon McKay
Collections of personal stories from the time of the Holocaust
 Whispers from the Ghettos (2009, Puffin Canada)
 Whispers from the Camps (2009, Puffin Canada)
 Whispers in Hiding (2010, Puffin Canada)
 We Are Their Voice: Young people respond to the Holocaust (2011, Second Story)
 Shanghai Escape (2014, Second Story)
 The Magician of Auschwitz (2014, Second Story)

Adult fiction
Restitution: A family's fight for their heritage lost in the Holocaust

Awards
2008 National Jewish Book Award for The Diary of Laura's Twin
2009 The Louis L. Lockshin and Brenda Freedman Award, the Youth award of the Canadian Jewish Book Awards, for The Diary of Laura's Twin
2009 Yad Vashem Award for Children's Holocaust Literature for Hiding Edith
Finalist in the Norma Fleck Award in 2005 (The Underground Reporters), 2006 (Hiding Edith) and 2010 (Whispers from the Ghetto)
 And several provincial awards and shortlistings for other awards

Notes

References

External links

 Kathy Kacer at publisher Second Story Press
 

1954 births
Living people
Canadian children's writers
Canadian historical novelists
Writers from Toronto
Canadian women novelists
20th-century Canadian novelists
21st-century Canadian novelists
20th-century Canadian women writers
21st-century Canadian women writers